Perumbur Ist Sethi is a village in the Thanjavur taluk of Thanjavur district, Tamil Nadu, India.

Demographics 

Per the 2001 census, Perumbur Ist Sethi had a total population of 2353 with 1146 males and 1207 females. The sex ratio was 1053. The literacy rate was 69.68.

References 

 

Villages in Thanjavur district